Clara Østø (14 January 1911 – 22 May 1983) was a Danish film actress. She appeared in 22 films between 1934 and 1979. She was born Laurita Clara Hansine Østergaard Olsen in Århus, Denmark and died in Copenhagen.

Selected filmography
 Ud i den kolde sne (1934)
 Bag Københavns kulisser (1935)
 En ganske almindelig pige (1940)
 Så mødes vi hos Tove (1946) 
 Det var paa Rundetaarn (1955)
 Jeg elsker dig (1957)
 Spøgelsestoget (1976)

External links

1911 births
1983 deaths
Danish film actresses
People from Aarhus
20th-century Danish actresses